is a former Japanese women's professional shogi player who achieved the rank of 1-kyū.

Yamaguchi graduated from the Faculty of Letters of Kyoto University in 2018.

On March 30, 2022, the Japan Shogi Association announced that it had accepted Yamaguchi's notification that she was leaving the association and would no longer be competing as a women's professional. Yamaguchi played 90 games as a women's professional; she won 27 and lost 63 for a winning percentage of 30 percent.

Promotion history
Yamaguchi's promotion history was as follows:

2014, October 1: 3-kyū
2016, April 21: 2-kyū
2016, August 13: 1-kyū

Note: All ranks are women's professional ranks.

References

External links
 ShogiHub: Yamaguchi, Emina

1994 births
Living people
Japanese shogi players
Women's professional shogi players
Professional shogi players from Miyazaki Prefecture
Kyoto University alumni
Retired women's professional shogi players